Diethylstilbestrol diacetate (DESDA) (brand name Hormostilboral Stark) is a synthetic, nonsteroidal estrogen of the stilbestrol group and an ester of diethylstilbestrol (DES) that was introduced for clinical use in the 1940s and was formerly marketed but is now no longer available.

References

Acetate esters
Estrogen esters
Synthetic estrogens